Mitchell County is a county in the U.S. state of Georgia. As of the 2020 census, the population was 21,755. The county seat is Camilla. Mitchell County was created on December 21, 1857.

History 
Mitchell County was created out of Baker County on December 21, 1857. It is the state's 123rd county.

Name origin 
Sources conflict as to whether Mitchell County was named for David Brydie Mitchell, the 27th Governor of Georgia, or for Henry Mitchell, a general in the Revolutionary War. However, it is most likely that the county was named for General Henry Mitchell, as a marker outside of the Mitchell County Courthouse says, "However, the Georgia Laws of 1857 (pages 38-40), creating Mitchell County, say the county was named in honor of Gen. Henry Mitchell...."

Geography

The bulk of Mitchell County is located in the Lower Flint River sub-basin of the ACF River Basin (Apalachicola-Chattahoochee-Flint River Basin). The county's southeastern corner, bordered by a line from Sale City southwest through Pelham, is located in the Lower Ochlockonee River sub-basin of the same Ochlockonee River basin.

Major highways

  U.S. Route 19
  State Route 3
  State Route 37
  State Route 37 Connector
  State Route 65
  State Route 93
  State Route 97
  State Route 111
  State Route 112
  State Route 262
  State Route 270
  State Route 300
  State Route 311

Adjacent counties
 Dougherty County (north)
 Worth County (northeast)
 Colquitt County (east)
 Thomas County (southeast)
 Grady County (south)
 Decatur County (southwest)
 Baker County (west)

Government
The County Commission meets the second Tuesday of each month at 7 pm.

Demographics

2000 census
As of the census of 2000, there were 23,932 people, 8,063 households, and 5,934 families living in the county. The population density was 18/km2 (47/mi2). There were 8,880 housing units at an average density of 7/km2 (17/mi2). The racial makeup of the county was 49.57% White, 47.86% Black or African American, 0.20% Native American, 0.27% Asian, 0.05% Pacific Islander, 1.34% from other races, and 0.70% from two or more races. 2.05% of the population were Hispanic or Latino of any race.

There were 8,063 households, out of which 34.40% had children younger than 18 living with them, 46.60% were married couples living together, 22.50% had a female householder with no husband present and 26.40% were non-families. 23.30% of all households were made up of individuals, and 9.50% had someone living alone who was 65 older. The average household size was 2.72, and the average family size was 3.19.

In the county, the population was spread out, with 27.30% younger than 18, 9.90% from 18 to 24, 29.40% from 25 to 44, 21.60% from 45 to 64, and 11.70% who were 65 older. The median age was 34 years. For every 100 females, there were 103.50 males. For every 100 females 18 and older, there were 101.00 males.

The median income for a household in the county was $26,581, and the median income for a family was $31,262. Males had a median income of $25,130 vs. $19,582 for females. The per capita income for the county was $13,042. About 22.30% of families and 26.40% of the population were below the poverty line, including 38.50% of those younger than 18 and 20.30% of those 65 or older.

2010 census
As of the 2010 United States Census, there were 23,498 people, 8,055 households, and 5,761 families living in the county. The racial makeup of the county was 47.9% white, 47.7% black or African American, 0.5% Asian, 0.3% American Indian, 2.4% from other races, and 1.0% from two or more races. Those of Hispanic or Latino origin made up 4.4% of the population. In terms of ancestry, 13.0% were American, 5.8% were Irish, and 5.2% were English.

Of the 8,055 households, 37.0% had children under the age of 18 living with them, 43.0% were married couples living together, 23.2% had a female householder with no husband present, 28.5% were non-families, and 25.0% of all households were made up of individuals. The average household size was 2.65 and the average family size was 3.15. The median age was 37.1 years.

The median income for a household in the county was $36,198 and the median income for a family was $43,930. Males had a median income of $36,272 versus $25,243 for females. The per capita income for the county was $16,322. About 16.4% of families and 22.2% of the population were below the poverty line, including 28.9% of those under age 18 and 13.2% of those age 65 or over.

2020 census

As of the 2020 United States census, there were 21,755 people, 7,982 households, and 5,454 families residing in the county.

Education

The Mitchell County School District operates public schools.

Higher Education
Andersonville Theological Seminary has its headquarters based in Camilla.  The seminary's headquarters consists of two administrative buildings.  Most of the seminary's students take online classes to complete their degree programs, but in January 2020 the school started to provide on-site courses at their location in Camilla.

Communities

Cities
 Baconton
 Camilla
 Meigs (partly in Thomas County)
 Pelham

Towns
 Sale City

Unincorporated communities

 Adelaide
 Akridge
 Branchville
 Cotton
 DeWitt
 Flint
 Greenough
 Greenwood
 Hinsonton
 Hopeful
 Laney
 Lester
 Pebble City
 Petty
 Rogerville
 Saco
 Vada (partly in Decatur County)

Politics

Notable people
 George Thornewell Smith - former Lieutenant Governor of Georgia and state court judge

See also

 National Register of Historic Places listings in Mitchell County, Georgia
List of counties in Georgia

References

 
Georgia (U.S. state) counties
1857 establishments in Georgia (U.S. state)
Populated places established in 1857
Majority-minority counties in Georgia